Abdoulaye Seck may refer to:

 Abdoulaye Seck (footballer, born 1988), Senegalese footballer
 Abdoulaye Seck (footballer, born 1992), Senegalese footballer